This is a list of the first minority male lawyer(s) and judge(s) in Rhode Island. It includes the year in which the men were admitted to practice law (in parentheses). Also included are those who achieved other distinctions, such becoming the first in their state to graduate from law school or become a political figure.

Firsts in Rhode Island's history

Lawyers 

First African American male: John Henry Ballou (1874) 
First African American male admitted to practice before the U.S. Circuit Court of Rhode Island: William A. Heathman (1898) in 1901  
 First Italian American male: Antonio A. Capotosto (1904) 
First African American male lawyer to work for the Attorney General's Office of Rhode Island: Walter R. Stone (1973)

Law Clerk 

First African American male to clerk for the Supreme Court of Rhode Island: William A. Heathman (1898) around 1912

State judges 

First Jewish American male: J. Jerome Hahn in 1919 
First Jewish American male (Supreme Court of Rhode Island): J. Jerome Hahn in 1929 
First African American male: Alton W. Wiley, Sr. (1951) in 1981 
 First Latino American males: Roberto González and Rafael A. Ovalles respectively 2004-2005

Political Office 

 First Asian American male (Chinese descent) (mayor): Allan Fung (1995) in 2008 
 First openly gay male (Speaker of the Rhode Island House of Representatives): Gordon Fox from 2010-2014

Firsts in local history 
 David Cicilline (1986): First Jewish and openly LGBT male (a lawyer) to become the Mayor of Providence, Rhode Island (2003-2011) [Providence County, Rhode Island]
Angel Taveras: First Hispanic male (a lawyer of Dominican descent) to become the Mayor of Providence, Rhode Island (2011-2015) [Providence County, Rhode Island]
Joseph Molina Flynn: First openly gay Latino American male to serve as a municipal court judge in Central Falls, Rhode Island (2021) [Providence County, Rhode Island]

See also 

 List of first minority male lawyers and judges in the United States

Other topics of interest 

 List of first women lawyers and judges in the United States
 List of first women lawyers and judges in Rhode Island

References 

 
Minority, Rhode Island, first
Minority, Rhode Island, first
Legal history of Rhode Island
Rhode Island lawyers
Lists of people from Rhode Island